Audoen (sometimes Audin or Ouen) was a medieval Bishop of Évreux in Normandy. He was the son of Anger, a canon of London, and brother of Thurstan, the Archbishop of York. Audoen served as bishop from 1113 to 1139.

Citations

References

 

Bishops of Évreux
12th-century French Roman Catholic bishops
1139 deaths
Year of birth unknown